Any enzyme system that includes cytochrome P450 protein or domain can be called a P450-containing system.

P450 enzymes usually function as a terminal oxidase in multicomponent electron-transfer chains, called P450-containing monooxygenase systems, although self-sufficient, non-monooxygenase P450s have been also described. All known P450-containing monooxygenase systems share common structural and functional domain architecture. Apart from the cytochrome itself, these systems contain one or more fundamental redox domains: FAD-containing flavoprotein or domain, FMN domain, ferredoxin and cytochrome b5. These ubiquitous redox domains, in various combinations, are widely distributed in biological systems. FMN domain, ferredoxin or cytochrome b5 transfer electrons between the flavin reductase (protein or domain) and P450. While P450-containing systems are found throughout all kingdoms of life, some organisms lack one or more of these redox domains.

FR/Fd/P450 systems 

Mitochondrial and some bacterial P450 systems employ soluble Fe2S2 ferredoxins (Fd) that act as single electron carriers between FAD-containing ferredoxin reductase (FR) and P450. In mitochondrial monooxygenase systems, adrenodoxin functions as a soluble electron carrier between NADPH:adrenodoxin reductase and several membrane-bound P450s (CYP11A, CYP11B, CYP27). In bacteria, putidaredoxin, terpredoxin, and rhodocoxin serve as electron carriers between corresponding NADH-dependent ferredoxin reductases and soluble P450s (CYP101, CYP108, CYP116).

{| border="0" width="60%" cellpadding="3" cellspacing="1" style="text-align:center;"
|-----
| align="right" | NADH || →
| putidaredoxin reductase
| →
| putidaredoxin
| →
| CYP101
| → || O2
|-----
| align="right" | NADH || →
| terpredoxin reductase
| →
| terpredoxin
| →
| CYP108
| → || O2
|-----
| align="right" | NADH || →
| rhodocoxin reductase
| →
| rhodocoxin
| →
| CYP116
| → || O2
|-----
| align="right" | NADPH || →
| Adrenodoxin reductase
| →
| Adrenodoxin
| →
| CYP11A1
| → || O2
|}

The general scheme of electron flow in the P450 systems containing adrenodoxin-type ferredoxins is:

{| border="0" width="60%" cellpadding="3" cellspacing="1" style="text-align:center;"
|-----
| align="right" | NAD(P)H || →
| bgcolor="orange" | FAD
| →
| bgcolor="lightgreen" | Fe2S2
| →
| bgcolor="lightblue" | P450
| → || O2
|}

CPR/P450 systems 

Eukaryotic microsomal P450 enzymes and some bacterial P450s receive electrons from a FAD- and FMN-containing enzyme known as cytochrome P450 reductase (CPR). Microsomal CPR is membrane-bound protein that interacts with different P450s. In Bacillus megaterium and Bacillus subtilis, CPR is a C-terminal domain of CYP102, a single polypeptide self-sufficient soluble P450 system (P450 is an N-terminal domain). The general scheme of electron flow in the CPR/P450 system is:

{| border="0" width="60%" cellpadding="3" cellspacing="1" style="text-align:center;"
|-----
| align="right" | NADPH || →
| bgcolor="orange" | FAD
| →
| bgcolor="yellow" | FMN
| →
| bgcolor="lightblue" | P450
| → || O2
|}

CBR/b5/P450 systems 

The ubiquitous electron-transport protein cytochrome b5 can serve as an effector (activator or inhibitor) of P450s. It was hypothesized that cytochrome b5 is involved in the transfer of the second electron to P450, either from CPR or from NADH:cytochrome b5 reductase (CBR):

{| border="0" width="60%" cellpadding="3" cellspacing="1" style="text-align:center;"
|-----
| align="right" | NADPH || →
| CPR || →
| cyt b5
| → || P450
| → || O2
|-----
| align="right" | NADH || →
| CBR || →
| cyt b5
| → || P450
| → || O2
|}

The ability of the CBR/cytochrome b5 system to support P450 catalysis has been demonstrated in vitro using purified CBR and cytochrome b5 from Saccharomyces cerevisiae and CYP51 enzyme from Candida albicans. In this system, both the first and second electrons are donated by CBR.

{| border="0" width="60%" cellpadding="3" cellspacing="1" style="text-align:center;"
|-----
| align="right" | NAD(P)H
| →
| bgcolor="orange" |FAD
| →
| bgcolor="lightpink" | b5
| →
| bgcolor="lightblue" | P450
| → 
| O2
|}

FMN/Fd/P450 systems 

An unusual one-component P450 system was originally found in Rhodococcus sp. NCIMB 9784 (CYP116B2). In this system, the N-terminal P450 domain is fused to the reductase domain that shows sequence similarity to phthalate dioxygenase reductase and consists, in its turn, of FMN-binding domain and C-terminal plant-type ferredoxin domain. Similar systems have been identified in the heavy-metal-tolerant bacterium Ralstonia metallidurans (CYP116A1) and in several species of Burkolderia.
The general scheme of electron flow in this system appears to be:

{| border="0" width="60%" cellpadding="3" cellspacing="1" style="text-align:center;"
|-----
| align="right" | NADH || →
| bgcolor="yellow" | FMN
| →
| bgcolor="lightgreen" | Fe2S2
| →
| bgcolor="lightblue" | P450
| → || O2
|}

P450-only systems 

Nitric oxide reductase (P450nor) is a P450 enzyme involved in denitrification in several fungal species. The best-characterized P450nor is CYP55A1 from Fusarium oxysporum. This enzyme does not have monooxygenase activity but is able to reduce nitric oxide (NO·) to form nitrous oxide (N2O) directly using NAD(P)H as electron donor:

{| border="0" width="40%" cellpadding="3" cellspacing="1" style="text-align:center;"
|-----
| align="right" | NAD(P)H || →
| bgcolor="lightblue" | P450
| → || NO·
|}

Fatty acid β-hydroxylase P450BSβ from Bacillus subtilis (CYP152A1) and fatty acid α-hydroxylase P450SPα from Pseudomonas paucimobilis (CYP152B1) catalyse the hydroxylation reaction of long-chain fatty acids using hydrogen peroxide (H2O2) as an oxidant. These enzymes do not require any reduction system for catalysis.

Allene oxide synthase (CYP74A), fatty acid hydroperoxide lyase (CYP74B), prostacyclin synthase (CYP8) and thromboxane synthase (CYP5) are examples of P450 enzymes that do not require a reductase or molecular oxygen for their catalytic activity. Substrates for all these enzymes are fatty acid derivatives containing partially reduced dioxygen (either hydroperoxy or epidioxy groups).

References

External links
 Directory of P450-containing Systems